The 1984–85 FDGB-Pokal was the 34th East German Cup. For the second consecutive year, Dynamo Dresden beat BFC Dynamo in the final, securing their sixth title.

First round 

 One asterisk: Club came through the qualifying round
 Two asterisks: Club came through the qualifying round and won the Bezirkspokal

2nd round

Round of 16 
(3 November and 21–22 December 1984)

Quarter-finals 
(20 and 27 February 1985)

Semi-finals 
(23 March and 1 May 1985)

Final

Controversies during the final 
The standard of refereeing in East German football had become a bone of contention in the upper levels of the SED and the East German regime, and the cup final was played at a time when the disillusionment about the successes of BFC Dynamo stood at its peak.

The German Football Association of the GDR (DFV) and the football weekly Die neue Fußballwoche (FuWo) received more than 700 complaints regarding the performance of the referees in the final. Harry Tisch was so upset about the performance of referee Manfred Roßner that he protested to Erich Mielke and complained that such performance undermined the credibility of the competition. With DFV functionaries, as well as Egon Krenz and other SED politicians, uneasy about the negative reactions, a special review of the final was conducted.

An eight person panel led by DFV president Günter Erbach examined the video recording of the cup final on 21 June 1985. The review found that 30 percent of the referee decisions were wrong, and that 80 percent of those had been of disadvantage to Dynamo Dresden. The referees had made 17 major mistakes during the final, of which 14 had been in favor of BFC Dynamo and 3 in favor of Dynamo Dresden. Of the 10 most egregious mistakes, 9 went against Dynamo Dresden. As an example, a regular goal from Ralf Minge was denied due to an alleged offside position. Referee Manfred Roßner was banned one year from officiating matches above second tier and assistant Klaus Scheurell was de-selected for the next round of the European cup. The cup final was the last match before retirement for assistant Widukind Herrmann.

Manfred Roßner conceded that he performed poorly during the final, but insisted that this was unintentional and unrepresentative of his "impressive record". Nothing emerged that indicated that Manfred Roßner had been bought by the Stasi. On the contrary, Manfred Roßner claims that he was approached by the DFV Deputy General Secretary Volker Nickchen before the match, who confidentially requested "no BFC-friendly decisions". He was also approached by the incensed DFV Vice President Franz Rydz after the match, who took him to office for his performance with the words: "You can't always go by the book, but have to officiate in a way that placates the Dresden public".

Notes

References

External links 
 DDR Football 1984/85 at rsssf.com

FDGB-Pokal seasons
East
Cup